Canada competed at the 2022 Commonwealth Games in Birmingham, England. This was Canada's 22nd appearance at the Commonwealth Games, having competed at every Games since their inception in 1930. 

Benoît Huot was the original Chef de Mission. However, after Huot stepped down due to family commitments, 2018 Chef de Mission, Claire Carver-Dias and former sprinter and Commonwealth Games athlete Sam Effah were named as co-Chefs de Mission in April 2022.

On July 21, 2022 para-athlete Josh Cassidy and weightlifter Maude Charron were named as flagbearers for the opening ceremony. Meanwhile, the first Canadian female squash medalist at the Commonwealth Games, Hollie Naughton was the closing ceremony flagbearer.

Canada's team consisted of 268 athletes (126 men and 142 women) competing in 17 sports,, which consisted of a mix of top and next-gen athletes. Carson Miles was added to the team during the games, increasing the team size to 127 men and 269 total. Canada did not compete in cricket, netball and para-powerlifting.

Canada finished the games with 26 gold medals, placing it third on the medal table. This was 12 more gold medals then four years ago at the 2018 Commonwealth Games. Canada met its goals of placing third in the overall medal table with 92 medals (26 gold, 32 silver and 34 bronze), which was the most medals won by the country since the 2002 Commonwealth Games in Manchester, England. A total of 22 athletes won two or more medals, including 15 year old swimmer Summer McIntosh, who won six medals.

Competitors
The following is the list of number of competitors participating at the Games per sport/discipline.

One guide is not included in the numbers.

Medallists

|  style="text-align:left; vertical-align:top;"|

| width="22%" align="left" valign="top" |

3x3 basketball

Canada has qualified to compete in both the men's and women's tournaments. On May 23, 2022, it was confirmed that Canada had earned a bipartie spot for each of the wheelchair tournaments. This meant team size overall for basketball was 16 (eight per gender), the maximum permitted. The 3x3 teams were officially named on July 18, 2022. The wheelchair teams were officially named on July 22, 2022.

Summary

Men's tournament

Roster
Bikramjit Gill
Alex Johnson
Jordan Jensen-Whyte
Adam Paige

Group A

Quarterfinals

Semifinals

Bronze medal match

Women's tournament

Roster
Taya Hanson
Rosalie Mercille
Sarah Te-Biasu
Tara Wallack

Group A

Quarterfinals

Semifinals

Gold medal match

Men's wheelchair

Garrett Ostepchuk was named to the team but did not compete.

Roster
Vincent Dallaire
Colin Higgins
Robert Hedges

Group B

Semifinals

Gold medal match

Women's wheelchair

Roster
Kady Dandeneau
Tara Llanes
Tamara Steeves
Elodie Tessier

Group A

Semifinals

Gold medal match

Athletics (track and field)

On May 13, 2022, Athletics Canada named an initial para-athletics team of six athletes. The later additions of Alex Dupont, Nandini Sharma, Thomas Normandeau and Natalie Thirsk raised the team size to ten athletes (six men and four women). Canada's able-bodied team was given a quota of 33 athletes by Commonwealth Sport Canada. The 33 member able-bodied team (13 men and 20 women) was officially named on June 21, 2022. On July 26, 2022, Andre De Grasse, Jerome Blake, Aaron Brown and Pierce LePage withdrew from the team citing difficulties encountered at the 2022 World Athletics Championships, which concluded the week before the games.

Men
Track and road events

Field events

Women
Track and road events

Field events

Badminton

As of June 1, 2022, Canada qualified for the mixed team event via the BWF World Rankings. The team of eight athletes (four per gender) was named June 29, 2022.

Mixed team

Summary

Squad
All eight athletes listed above competed in the team event.

Group 3

Quarterfinals

Beach volleyball

Canada qualified a men's and women's pair, after having the top ranked pair in the FIVB Beach Volleyball World Rankings as of March 31, 2022. The team was officially named on June 24, 2022.

Men's tournament

Group A

Quarterfinals

Semifinals

Gold medal match

Women's tournament

Group A

Quarterfinals

Semifinals

Gold medal match

Boxing

Canada's six member boxing team (four men and two women) was named on May 26, 2022.

Cycling

Canada's cycling team was given a quota of 16 athletes by Commonwealth Sport Canada (eight per gender). Later, Canada received an additional two women's quotas to enter in the women's team pursuit in track cycling. Due to scheduling conflicts and a limited athlete quota, Canada will not compete in the mountain biking discipline. The team of 18 athletes (eight men and ten women) was announced on June 28, 2022. Carson Miles was a last minute addition to the team, to replace Derek Gee, who was injured during the track cycling competition.

Road
Men

Women

Track
Keirin

Sprint

Time trial

Points race

Pursuit

Scratch race

Diving

Canada's diving team of ten athletes (five per gender) was named on June 27, 2022.

Men

Women

Mixed

Field hockey

By virtue of their position in the FIH World Rankings for men and women respectively (as of 1 February 2022), Canada qualified for both tournaments.

Detailed fixtures were released on 9 March 2022.

Summary

Men's tournament

Roster
Canada's roster of 18 athletes was announced on July 4, 2022.
 
Gavin Bains
Alexander Bird
Fin Boothroyd
Tristan Burgoyne
Taylor Curran
Roopkanwar Dhillon
Brendan Guraliuk
Manveer Jhamat
Ethan McTavish
Devohn Noronha-Teixeira
Balraj Panesar
Keegan Pereira
Matthew Sarmento
Oliver Scholfield
Harbir Sidhu
Gurpreet Singh
John Smythe
Floris van Son

Pool B

Seventh place match

Women's tournament

Roster
Canada's roster of 18 athletes was announced on July 4, 2022.

 
Alexis de Armond
Grace Delmotte
Jordyn Faiczak
Sara Goodman
Rowan Harris
Hannah Haughn
Karli Johansen
Chloe Walton
Marcia LaPlante
Melanie Scholz
Sara McManus
Anna Mollenhauer
Audrey Sawers
Madeline Secco
Natalie Sourisseau
Brienne Stairs
Madison Thompson
Amanda Woodcroft

Pool A

Fifth place match

Gymnastics

Canada's gymnastics team of 14 athletes (six men and eight women) was named on July 8, 2022.

Artistic
Canada's artistic gymnastics team consisted of five men and five women. René Cournoyer was injured and not replaced on the team.

Men
Team Final & Individual Qualification

Individual Finals

Women
Team final & Individual Qualification

Individual Finals

Rhythmic
Canada's rhythmic gymnastics team consisted of three women.

Team final & Individual Qualification

Individual Finals

Judo

Canada's nine member judo team (five men and four women) was announced on June 21, 2022. The team consisted of established athletes and younger athletes.

Men

Women

Lawn bowls

Canada's lawn bowls team will consist of ten athletes (five per gender) competing in the able-bodied events, it was announced on June 9, 2022. The team was selected based on results at a training camp held in Windsor, Ontario during May 2022.

Men

Women

Rugby sevens

Canada qualified for both the men's and women's tournaments, for a total of 26 athletes (13 per team). This was achieved through their positions in the 2018–19 / 2019–20 World Rugby Sevens Series and 2018–19 / 2019–20 World Rugby Women's Sevens Series respectively. 

Summary

Men's tournament

Roster
Canada's 13 member team was announced on July 12, 2022.

Nick Allen
Phil Berna
Ciaran Breen
D’Shawn Bowen
Cooper Coats
Elias Hancock
Lachlan Kratz
Josiah Morra
Anton Ngongo
Matthew Oworu
Alex Russell
Jake Thiel
Brock Webster

Preliminary round
Pool C

Quarterfinals

5th–8th Semi-finals

Women's tournament

Roster
Canada's 13 member team was announced on July 12, 2022.

Olivia Apps
Fancy Bermudez
Pamphinette Buisa
Emma Chown
Chloe Daniels
Olivia De Couvreur
Bianca Farella
Renee Gonzalez
Nakisa Levale
Piper Logan
Breanne Nicholas
Krissy Scurfield
Keyara Wardley

Preliminary round
Pool A

Semifinals

Bronze medal match

Squash

Canada's four member squash team (two men and two women) was named on June 21, 2022. Hollie Naughton became the first Canadian women to win a Commonwealth Games medal in the sport of squash.

Individual

Doubles

Swimming

Canada's able-bodied swimming team of 23 athletes (10 men and 13 women) was officially named on April 11, 2022, after the conclusion of the Canadian Swim Trials in Victoria, British Columbia. On May 9, 2022, the para-swimming team of eight athletes (three men and four women) was also named. The announcement also confirmed swimmer Stephen Calkins would replace Yuri Kisil due to the latter's injury. On June 15, 2022, Penny Oleksiak withdrew from the team, citing preparations for the 2023 season into the 2024 Summer Olympics. On June 17, 2022, Mabel Zavaros was named as Oleksiak's replacement. Sydney Pickrem also withdrew due to personal reasons and was not replaced.

Men

Women

Mixed

 Swimmers who participated in the heats only and received medals.

Table tennis

By virtue of its position in the ITTF World Team Rankings (as of 2 January 2020), Canada qualified both a men's and a women's team.

An initial squad of six was selected following their performances at the National Selection Team Tournament between 25 and 27 March 2022. The full squad of eight was later confirmed on 7 April 2022. Two Para-sport athletes were also named to the team.

Singles

Doubles

Team

Triathlon

Canada's team of eight triathletes (three men and five women) was announced on June 30, 2022. For the first time ever, Canada qualified an entry into paratriathlon.

Individual

Mixed Relay

Weightlifting

Canada qualified 14 weightlifters (six men and eight women), all of whom were officially selected on 24 March 2022. Boady Santavy, Maya Laylor and Kristel Ngarlem qualified at the 2021 Commonwealth Weightlifting Championships in Tashkent, Uzbekistan. The other 11 qualified through their respective Commonwealth Weightlifting ranking as of 28 February 2022.

Men

Women

Wrestling

Canada's wrestling team consisted of 12 athletes (six male and six female). The team was announced on June 14, 2022. All 12 members of the wrestling team won a medal each. The Canadian team won three gold, five silver and four bronze medals in total.

Freestyle
Men

Women

See also
Canada at the 2022 Winter Olympics
Canada at the 2022 Winter Paralympics
Canada at the 2022 World Aquatics Championships
Canada at the 2022 World Athletics Championships

References

External links
Birmingham 2022 Commonwealth Games Official site

2022
Nations at the 2022 Commonwealth Games
Commonwealth Games